James Garland may refer to:

 James Garland (Virginia politician) (1791–1885), politician and lawyer from Virginia
 James Garland (Australian politician) (1813–1904), member of the New South Wales Legislative Assembly
 James C. Garland (born 1942), physicist, author and  president of Miami University, Oxford, Ohio
 James Henry Garland (born 1931), bishop of the Catholic Church in the United States
 James F. Garland, American politician in the Virginia House of Delegates